Brandon Edward Barnes (born June 12, 1981) is a former American football linebacker of the National Football League. He was signed by the Baltimore Ravens as an undrafted free agent in 2004. He played college football at Missouri.

Barnes also played for the Washington Redskins.

External links
Missouri Tigers bio

People from Sikeston, Missouri
American football linebackers
Missouri Tigers football players
Baltimore Ravens players
Washington Redskins players
Missouri Tigers football coaches
1981 births
Living people